Hasan Türk (born 20 March 1993 in Gönen, Turkey) is a Turkish footballer who plays as a midfielder or winger for Kemerspor 2003. A product of Beşiktaş A2, he was promoted to senior level in the beginning of the 2012-13 season.

Made 8 Süper Lig appearances at 2012–13 season, Türk was loaned out Göztepe S.K., Kırıkkalespor and, Bayrampaşaspor respectively for 2013–14, 2014–15 and 2015–16 seasons.

Career
Started his career at Mahmutbeyspor, a local club in Bağcılar district in Istanbul, Türk joined Beşiktaş in 2006. He scored 11 goals in 74 games in youth level. He made his senior level league debut against İstanbul BB in week 1 of 2012-13 season, on 20 August 2012. Türk gained his spot in starting line-up of the team in 2012–13 Turkish Cup 2nd round encounter ended 2–1 for Beşiktaş, against Niğde Belediyespor, Regional Amateur League outfit.

Following being released by Beşiktaş 19 January 2016, he signed in Üsküdar Anadolu S.K., another Istanbul team. Pleased 5 games at the club, he was released on 28 June 2016.

Statistics
(Correct as of 26 December 2015)

References

External links
 Profile on TFF
 
 Hasan Türk at Soccerway

1993 births
Living people
People from Gönen
Turkish footballers
Turkey youth international footballers
Beşiktaş J.K. footballers
Göztepe S.K. footballers
Süper Lig players
Association football forwards
Association football midfielders